"Christmas Tree" is a song by American singer Lady Gaga. It was released on December 16, 2008, for digital download. It was written and produced by Gaga, Martin Kierszenbaum, and Space Cowboy, who also provides guest vocals. Musically, "Christmas Tree" is a Christmas song with dance-pop and synthpop influences. It samples the classic Christmas song "Deck the Halls", as well as briefly using the lyrics "Rum pum pum pum" from the Christmas song "The Little Drummer Boy" in its intro. Lyrically, the song uses sexual innuendos.

The song received mixed reviews from music critics, with some commending its creativity and individuality from other Christmas songs and others criticizing its sexual innuendos and deeming it "not for the family". Due to strong digital sales, it reached number 79 on the Canadian Hot 100 chart in January 2009. It also reached number 18 on the Japanese RIAJ Digital Track Chart and number 23 on the Billboard Holiday/Seasonal Digital Songs chart in the United States in late 2010. In December 2009, it was available for free download on Amazon as part of the site's "25 Days of Free" promotion. The song has been included in several Christmas compilation albums, including Now That's What I Call Christmas! 4.

Background
"Christmas Tree" is a Christmas music-themed song, featuring vocals from Gaga and Space Cowboy. It was written and produced by Gaga, Space Cowboy and Martin Kierszenbaum. Space Cowboy and Gaga were introduced in Los Angeles by Martin Kierszenbaum, the head of Gaga's label, Cherrytree Records, an imprint of Interscope Records. Kierszenbaum recommended a collaboration between them after hearing Space Cowboy's single "My Egyptian Lover", released in January 2007 and featuring vocalist Nadia Oh. Kierszenbaum contacted Space Cowboy during December 2007 and Space Cowboy first spoke to Gaga by phone on New Year's Eve, "[getting] along so well right away" talking about sequins, disco balls, Prince, David Bowie and body paint. The pair worked together in Los Angeles to create "Christmas Tree" and "Starstruck", a song from some editions of Lady Gaga's then-current album The Fame. Space Cowboy commented of working with Lady Gaga:

Composition

"Christmas Tree" is a version of the traditional Christmas song "Deck the Halls", with the same melody but with lyrics changed to be sexually suggestive, with many sexual innuendos and metaphors. Lyrically, the song is "lewdly celebratory" with lines such as "Light me up put me on top/ Let's fa-la-la-la-la-, la-la, la, la". In an analysis by Stelios Phili of the Washington Square News, Phili jokes that the meaning of the song is closer to the original version of "Deck the Halls", a Welsh folk song called "Nos Galan" (Welsh for "New Year's Eve") traditionally sung at New Year's Eve, than the English Christmas version. He cites the original first line, "Cold is the man who can't love", and says that Gaga "seeks not to warn against becoming a cold, loveless man, but to prevent that fate by way of some hot lovin'".

The Christmas song contains dance-pop and synthpop music with synthesizers and a "pounding, grind-worthy beat". Space Cowboy described the song as "futuristic". Referenced in the song lyrics is producer Kierszenbaum's nickname of "Cherry Cherry Boom Boom". Describing the song in episode 25 of her YouTube broadcast series Gaga-vision, Gaga said: ""Christmas Tree" is about the spirit of celebrating the most joyous holiday and I'll tell you why: because Christmas is the holiday that most makes boys and girls feel randy."

Release
"Christmas Tree" was released as a digital download-only single on December 16, 2008, on Interscope Records while Gaga's first single "Just Dance", was charting. It was made available as an MP3 from Amazon and iTunes Store. The song was not included in Gaga's album The Fame. One year later, in December 2009, it was one of the songs free to download from Amazon.com as part of its "25 Days of Free" offer, whereby for the first twenty-five days in December a Christmas-themed song is made free to download from the website. "Christmas Tree" was made available on December 6. The song was included on several compilation albums: Canadian compilation album NOW! Christmas 4, Taiwanese compilation album Christmas 101 and the seasonal compilation album It's Christmas Time, all released for Christmas 2009. It was also included in the compilation albums Merry Xmas! and Now That's What I Call Christmas! 4, part of the Now That's What I Call Music series of compilation albums, both released for Christmas 2010. "Christmas Tree" was also included on The Singles, a box set of CD singles released exclusively in Japan in December 2010. It is on the ninth and last CD, which also includes the three live tracks from The Cherrytree Sessions.

Critical reception

"Christmas Tree" received mixed reviews from critics. Alex Rawls of OffBeat gave a positive review as part of the "25 Days of Free" offer from Amazon.com. Joking that the artists of the more religious songs must be "praying" for Lady Gaga, Rawls described the song as "not so po-faced" as the five songs released before it was made available on December 6, 2009. Estrella Adeyeri, the music editor of Nouse, gave the song a positive review, complimenting its "synth beats and numerous yuletide innuendos". Ryan Brockington of the New York Post praised the song, describing it as a "favorite holiday jam" and a "subliminal lady parts pine-tree jingle". A reviewer from gay.com described the song as "merry" and a "naughty choice", praising its "dark decadence". Gino dela Paz of The Philippine Star described the song as going from "zero to crazy" and Diana Nabiruma of The Weekly Observer called the song "plain naughty and wacky". Jason Lewis for Fast Forward Weekly called the song "charmingly ludicrous" and called it among "the best "new" holiday music out there". Chad Bullock of MTV included "Christmas Tree" in a list of "excellent" new Christmas music, describing it as "non-traditional and vaguely sexual".

Molly Gamble of Marquette Tribune gave "Christmas Tree" a negative review, criticising the song's "poorly veiled metaphor" for sex and calling the song "shameless". She commented that "Christmas Tree" is not a song one can listen to in the presence of family and that it "makes Christmas feel dirty".  Katie Hasty and Melinda Newman of HitFix gave the song a very negative review, calling it "stupendously stupid and awful" and the "most terrible Christmas song ever in the whole wide world ever", criticising its obvious sexual metaphors. Cassaundra Baber of Observer-Dispatch listed the song on list of "Horrible holiday hits", criticising it for being "sexualized" and calling it "not for the kids".

The song was described as "porn-tastic" in a review for Now! Christmas 4 by Eye Weekly reviewer Chris Bilton, quoting the lyric "My Christmas tree is delicious". Bilton also called it one of few tracks on the album that make it a "worthy stocking stuffer". Also in a review for Now! Christmas 4, Charlottetown Guardian reviewer Doug Gallant called "Christmas Tree" a "dreadful offering". Beverley Lunney, a reviewer for Winnipeg Free Press, gave the song a negative review, commenting that listeners would be "offended" by the song's "truly unfestive metaphors" and called it one of a "sea of unbearable original tunes" on Now! Christmas 4. Darryl Sterdan of the Ottawa Sun called the song "the only reason to buy" Now! Christmas 4 and recommended downloading it. In a review of Now! Christmas 4, John Lucas of The Georgia Straight described the song as a "filthy electro banger" and "so blatantly about [sex] that you have to wonder how in the hell it got past the usually vigilant Now! gatekeepers", calling it the "single exception" to an otherwise bland album. In a review for It's Christmas Time, Chester Chronicle reviewer Polly Weeks called the song something that "will keep teenagers happy". In a review for Now That's What I Call Christmas! 4, J Matthew Cobb of HiFi Magazine called "Christmas Tree" part of a "good list" of new material and described it as "naughty, but nice".

Chart performance
Due to high digital downloads, "Christmas Tree" entered the Canadian Hot 100 chart at number seventy-nine in the first week of January 2009, remaining on the chart for one week. In November 2010, "Christmas Tree" charted on the RIAJ Digital Track Chart of Japan, entering at position eighteen, its peak. The song then dropped to positions 51, 74, 81 and 100 before leaving the chart. Also in November 2010, "Christmas Tree" charted on the Billboard Holiday/Seasonal Digital Songs chart in the US, peaking at position 23. In December 2010, it was also ranked at number 23 on the "Hot 100 Holiday Christmas Songs" by Billboard, based on sales and airplay over the winter period as calculated by Nielsen SoundScan and Nielson BDS.

Track listing
Digital download
"Christmas Tree" (featuring Space Cowboy) – 2:22

Charts

References

External links

 Lady Gaga : Single : Christmas Tree Interscope Records

2008 songs
Lady Gaga songs
Songs written by Lady Gaga
American Christmas songs
Songs about trees
Songs written by Space Cowboy (musician)